The Gender Parity Index (GPI) is a socioeconomic index usually designed to measure the relative access to education of males and females. This index is released by UNESCO. In its simplest form, it is calculated as the quotient of the number of females by the number of males enrolled in a given stage of education (primary, secondary, etc.).  A GPI equal to one signifies equality between males and females.  A GPI less than one is an indication that gender parity favors males while a GPI greater than one indicates gender parity that favors females.  The closer a GPI is to one, the closer a country is to achieving equality of access between males and females. It is used by international organizations, particularly in measuring the progress of developing countries. The Institute for Statistics of UNESCO also uses a more general definition of GPI: for any development indicator one can define the GPI relative to this indicator by dividing its value for females by its value for males. For example, some UNESCO documents consider gender parity in literacy.

UNESCO describes attempts to eliminate gender disparities in primary and secondary education and emphasizes the plight of girls in unequal access in third world countries.

The World Economic Forum's Global Gender Gap Report 2022 allows users to look at and compare country GPI data, calculate their own country's gender parity, and explore global patterns.

See also

Indices 

 Bhutan GNH Index
 Broad measures of economic progress
 Disability-adjusted life year
 Full cost accounting
 Green national product
 Green gross domestic product (Green GDP)
 Gender-related Development Index
 Genuine Progress Indicator (GPI)
 Global Peace Index
 Gross National Happiness
 Gross National Well-being (GNW)
 Happiness economics
 Happy Planet Index (HPI)
 Human Development Index (HDI)
 ISEW (Index of sustainable economic welfare)
 Legatum Prosperity Index
 Leisure satisfaction
 Living planet index
 Millennium Development Goals (MDGs)
 Money-rich, time-poor
 OECD Better Life Index BLI
 Subjective life satisfaction
 Where-to-be-born Index
 Wikiprogress
 World Happiness Report (WHR)
 World Values Survey (WVS)

Other 
 Economics
 Democracy Ranking
 Demographic economics
 Economic development
 Ethics of care
 Human Development and Capability Association
 Human Poverty Index
 Progress (history)
 Progressive utilization theory
 Post-materialism
 Psychometrics
 International Association for Feminist Economics
 International development
 Sustainable development
 System of National Accounts
 Welfare economics
Gender Empowerment Measure
Gender-related Development Index
Gender equality
Gender inequality

References

Gender equality
Index numbers
Socioeconomics
Women and education